James Richard Gall  (born 20 May 1995) is an English field hockey player who plays as a midfielder for Surbiton and the England and Great Britain national teams.

He was educated at Cranleigh School, Surrey.

Club career
Gall plays club hockey in the Men's England Hockey League Premier Division for Surbiton. He re-joined Surbiton for the 2017-18 season, from University of Nottingham. He also played for Beeston.

International career
Gall made his senior debut for England versus South Africa in March 2017, having represented his country at under-16, under-18, and under-21 levels. He played for England under-21 in the 2013 and 2016 Junior World Cups and won a bronze medal at the 2014 European under-21 championships. He joined the Great Britain Centralised Programme in 2017 and was a member of the Great Britain squad which won the 2017 Sultan Azlan Shah Cup Final in Ipoh, Malaysia on 6 May 2017 – the first time either Great Britain or England had won this title since 1994.

References

External links

1995 births
Living people
English male field hockey players
Male field hockey midfielders
Field hockey players at the 2018 Commonwealth Games
2018 Men's Hockey World Cup players
Commonwealth Games medallists in field hockey
Commonwealth Games bronze medallists for England
Beeston Hockey Club players
Surbiton Hockey Club players
Men's England Hockey League players
Field hockey players at the 2020 Summer Olympics
Olympic field hockey players of Great Britain
People from Frimley
Medallists at the 2018 Commonwealth Games